WPG Resources (formerly Western Plains Gold) was a mining company focusing on exploration, evaluation and development of gold and coal projects in South Australia.

Western Plains Gold was founded in 2004 and listed on the Australian Securities Exchange (ASX) on 23 August 2005. The company was placed in receivership on 8 August 2018. It was delisted from the ASX on 3 February 2020.

The company operated the Challenger underground gold mine and 650,000 tonnes per annum capacity mill at Tarcoola, South Australia, and the Perseverance open pit mine 130 km to the southeast.

Port Pirie iron ore export proposal
The company purchased land and proposed to construct an enclosed iron ore stockpiling and associated loading facilities at Port Pirie on the eastern shore of Spencer Gulf, South Australia. The loading method proposed was transshipment by barge to waiting Cape or Panamax vessels. 

In 2011, the company sold iron ore assets to OneSteel. The assets included the Peculiar Knob iron deposit, located in the Woomera Protected Area. In November 2014, the company announced that it would sell its land at Port Pirie to help fund its gold development projects.

Diversification
In 2014, Tunkillia and Tarcoola gold projects were acquired by WPG Resources, marking the completion of the company's transition from an iron ore explorer to a diversified exploration and mining company. In 2015, WPG had a portfolio of exploration projects in South Australia covering a combined area of 5,373 square kilometres, including advanced gold projects. Targeted commodities included gold, nickel, base metals, iron ore and coal.

References

Companies based in Sydney 
Companies formerly listed on the Australian Securities Exchange
Mining companies of Australia
Non-renewable resource companies established in 2004
Non-renewable resource companies disestablished in 2018
2004 establishments in Australia
2018 disestablishments in Australia